Mesolamia marmorata is a species of beetle in the family Cerambycidae. It was described by Sharp in 1882. It is known from New Zealand.

References

Desmiphorini
Beetles described in 1882